Brickellia urolepis is a Mexican species of flowering plants in the family Asteraceae. It is native to northeastern Mexico in the states of Coahuila and Nuevo León.

References

External links
Photo of herbarium specimen collected in Nuevo León

urolepis
Flora of Northeastern Mexico
Plants described in 1942